A list of films produced in Italy in 1987 (see 1987 in film):

References

Footnotes

Sources

External links
 Italian films of 1987 at the Internet Movie Database

1987
Lists of 1987 films by country or language
Films